Two human polls and a committee's selections comprise the 2022 National Collegiate Athletic Association (NCAA) Division I Football Bowl Subdivision (FBS) football rankings, in addition to various publications' preseason polls. Unlike most sports, college football's governing body, the NCAA, does not bestow a national championship at the FBS level. Instead, that title is bestowed by one or more different polling agencies. There are two main weekly polls that begin in the preseason—the AP Poll and the Coaches Poll. One additional poll, the College Football Playoff (CFP) ranking, is usually released starting midway through the season. The CFP rankings determine who makes the four-team playoff that determines the College Football Playoff National Champion.

Legend

AP Poll

Ranking highlights
Preseason

Coaches Poll

CFP rankings
The initial 2022 College Football Playoff rankings were released on November 1, 2022.

Ranking highlights
Week 9
 Tennessee was ranked No. 1 for the first time in the CFP rankings, their previous high was No. 17.
 Illinois (No. 16), Tulane (No. 19), and Oregon State (No. 23) were all ranked in the CFP rankings for the first time since the format was adopted in 2014.
 Oklahoma's streak of 41 consecutive weeks in the CFP rankings ended, the Sooners overall have the third most appearances in the CFP rankings at 46 weeks, tied with Clemson.

Notes

References

Rankings
NCAA Division I FBS football rankings
Rankings